Pathibhara FM is a radio station in Nepal, based in Damak, Jhapa District. It broadcasts at 93.6mhz.

Website
www.pathibharafm.org

References

External links

Radio stations in Nepal